Chanting the Light of Foresight (imbas forasnai) is a 1987 composition by Terry Riley written for and commissioned by the Rova Saxophone Quartet, though during the course of the composition it was decided that Rova would compose "The Chord of War" and "The Pipes of Medb/Medb's Blues" contains improvisation.

The piece is based on the Taín Bó Cuailnge (The Cattle Raid of Cooley, translated by Thomas Kinsella), a part of the eighth-century Ulster Cycle of heroic tales.

The work is partly in resonant intonation, requiring false fingerings, jaw manipulations, and straining the lips and lungs, and contains many unusual time signatures. "The Tuning Path" and "The Pipes of Medb" progresses from simple to more complex areas of tuning, statically depicting night on the battlefield. "Medb's Blues" is in the form of a 6 bar 10/4 blues where players alternately keep a cantus firmus while others improvise. "Song Announcing Dawn's Combat" depicts foster brothers and main character adversaries Cúchulainn and Ferdia and uses 7/8 rhythms, pulsing drones, and Hindustani scales to refer to the Bhagavad Gita. Ferdia is killed by his brother with a secret weapon, gae bolga, which Cúchulainn removes from the body while lamenting in "Ferdia's Death Chant". Cúchulainn completes his training under Scáthach as a warrior and shaman, and she chants to him his future through the imbas forasnai through repeated phrases containing 8/8 and 7/8 measures. Only the first chord of the Rova-composed section does not appear throughout the rest of the piece.  Riley responded to Rova's concern for this by saying, "Well — that's the chord of war."

Movements
 The Tuning Path
 The Pipes of Medb/Medb's Blues
 Song Announcing Dawn's Combat
 The Chord of War
 Ferdia's Death Chant
 Chanting the Light of Foresight

The piece has been recorded and released on:
Chanting the Light of Foresight (1994), performed by Rova. New Albion: NA064CD.

Compositions by Terry Riley
Compositions in just intonation
1987 compositions
Compositions for saxophone